Kati-Kreet Marran (born 13 July 1998) is an Estonian badminton player. She competed at the 2019 European Games, reaching the quarter finals in the women's doubles partnered with Helina Rüütel.

Achievements

BWF International Challenge/Series (4 titles, 4 runners-up) 
Women's doubles

  BWF International Challenge tournament
  BWF International Series tournament
  BWF Future Series tournament

References

External links 

 

1998 births
Living people
Sportspeople from Tartu
Estonian female badminton players
Badminton players at the 2019 European Games
European Games competitors for Estonia